The M180 is a  motorway in eastern England, starting at junction 5 on the M18 motorway in Hatfield, within the Metropolitan Borough of Doncaster, South Yorkshire, and terminating at Barnetby, Lincolnshire, some  from the port of Immingham and  from the port of Grimsby. The A180 road continues to the east for Grimsby, Cleethorpes and Immingham. Scunthorpe, Lincoln, Hull (via the Humber Bridge), Brigg, Bawtry and the Isle of Axholme can be accessed using the motorway. Humberside Airport, the now-closed Doncaster Sheffield Airport, and the Killingholme, Humber and Lindsey oil refineries are close to the motorway. The road forms part of the unsigned Euroroute E22 and is the main route along the south bank of the Humber Estuary.

History

Planning and construction
The motorway bypass around Brigg was discussed for many years, but the Flixborough explosion gave it more importance, and was built three years later in 1977 as the second section of the motorway. The initial, and somewhat diminutive section of the motorway was the short-lived A18(M) also known as the Tudworth Link, which connected the roundabout junction with the M18 to the A18/A614. The easterly A18(M) sliproad is still used, though the original roundabout at junction 1 has now been replaced by a bridge close to Tudworth Hall Farm. The last section to be built was the Trent viaduct, opened in October 1979 by Kenneth Clarke, despite being 43 weeks late on account of strikes and bad weather.

Draft proposals were announced at the end of May 1973; there would be a bridge over the Trent at East Butterwick; there would be a 2.6-mile spur road to Scunthorpe, joining the A18 1000 yards west of the Berkeley Circle roundabout, with a motorway junction on Bottesford Moor; the 11.6 miles of new motorway, to the M181, would cost £16m.

The motorway is built to dual three-lane standard for most of its duration (aside from a short dual two-lane section past Scunthorpe), and is quite straight and flat.

The M180 has its own spur – the M181.  While the M180 has to make do with a roundabout junction with the M18, its spur has a large, freeflowing trumpet interchange. At the start of the M180 are the Doncaster North services, owned by Moto.Doncaster North

Contracts
 M18 to Sandtoft, £4.8m, Monk
 Trent Bridge, £3.8m, Cementation Construction, opened to westbound traffic on 20 July 1979, opened to eastbound traffic on Wednesday 31 October 1979; the 364 precast units, weighing between 35 and 75 tonnes, were made at Tallington by Dow-Mac
 Trent to Scunthorpe,  A.F. Budge of Retford
 Scunthorpe Southern Bypass,  Balfour Beatty Clugston Joint Venture, opened by Bill Rodgers, Baron Rodgers of Quarry Bank, at the Ermine Street Interchange, on Friday 15 December 1978; opened the same day as the final stretch of the M18

A180 extension 
It was extended in the 1980s to trunk-road standard as the A180 which is a two-lane dual carriageway which continues on to Grimsby and Cleethorpes. In its early planning stages, it was to be named the A18.

The £18 million  section from Brigg to Ulceby (A160) was opened on 29 March 1983 by Lynda Chalker, Baroness Chalker of Wallasey, and the £21 million  section from Ulceby to Grimsby opened in late 1983.

Junctions  
{| class="plainrowheaders wikitable"
|-
!scope=col|County
!scope=col|Location
!scope=col|mi
!scope=col|km
!scope=col|Junction
!scope=col|Destinations
!scope=col|Notes
|-
|rowspan="2"|South Yorkshire
|rowspan="2"|Thorne
|0
|0
|—
|  - Doncaster, Sheffield, Thorne
|
|-
|1.7
|1.0
| bgcolor="ffdddd" |1
| bgcolor="ffdddd" |  - Doncaster, Scunthorpe  - Thorne
| bgcolor="ffdddd" |No Westbound exit or Eastbound entrance
|-
|rowspan="4"|Lincolnshire
|—
|7.3
|11.8
|2
|  - Belton, Ealand
|
|-
|rowspan="2"|Scunthorpe
|12.1
|19.4
|3
|  - Scunthorpe
|
|-
|18.7
|30.1
|4
|  - Lincoln, Peterborough  - Keelby, Brigg
|
|-
|—
|25.4
|40.9
|5
|  - Hull  - Scunthorpe, Brigg  - Grimsby
|

*Ceremonial Counties
Coordinate list

References

External links

 Pathetic Motorways – M180
 UK Motorway Archive.

Motorways in England
Borough of North Lincolnshire
Roads in Doncaster
Roads in Lincolnshire